Luis Eduardo Ramos de Lucía (born 9 October 1939, died 14 March 2021) was a Uruguayan football defender who played for Uruguay in the 1966 FIFA World Cup. He also played for Club Nacional de Football. In Argentina, he played for Deportivo Español in 1967-'68. He died due to Covid-19.

His daughters Luisel and Eliana, both models, died within months of each other from causes related to anorexia nervosa.

References

External links
 FIFA profile

1939 births
Living people
Uruguayan footballers
Uruguay international footballers
Uruguayan expatriate footballers
Association football defenders
Uruguayan Primera División players
Club Nacional de Football players
Deportivo Español footballers
1966 FIFA World Cup players
Expatriate footballers in Argentina